Johannes Decker Farm is a historic farm complex and national historic district located at Gardiner in Ulster County, New York.  The district includes three contributing buildings and one contributing structure.  It consists of the main stone house dating from the 1720s, with three later 18th-century additions, a 1750s Dutch style barn, and a carriage and ice house also erected in the 18th century.  The main stone house is -story rubble dwelling with a flared Flemish gable roof.

It was listed on the National Register of Historic Places in 1974.

References

National Register of Historic Places in Ulster County, New York
Historic districts on the National Register of Historic Places in New York (state)
Houses completed in 1725
Historic districts in Ulster County, New York
1725 establishments in the Province of New York
Farms on the National Register of Historic Places in New York (state)